The Cappadocian chub (Squalius cappadocicus) is a species of freshwater fish in the family Cyprinidae. The species is endemic to the Melendiz River in Lake Tuz in Turkey, and critically endangered. It is considered harmless to humans.

References

Fish described in 2011
Squalius